UKAF may refer to:

 Ukrainian Air Force, the aerial warfare service branch of the armed forces of Ukraine
 United Kingdom Accreditation Forum, a British network of healthcare accreditation organizations

See also
Royal Air Force, United Kingdom's air force